The following is a list of unproduced David Lynch projects in roughly chronological order. During his long career, American film director David Lynch has worked on a number of projects which never progressed beyond the pre-production stage under his direction. Some of these projects fell into development hell or were officially cancelled.

1970s

Gardenback 
Before starting work on Eraserhead, he worked on a script titled Gardenback, based on his painting of a hunched figure with vegetation growing from its back. Gardenback was a surrealist script about adultery, featuring a continually growing insect that represented one man's lust for his neighbor. He presented the script to the AFI, but they rejected it as they felt the planned 45-minute runtime was too long for such a figurative, nonlinear script.

Ronnie Rocket 

After the success of Eraserhead, Lynch decided to focus on the screenplay of his second film, entitled Ronnie Rocket, which he also wanted to direct. The film's plot would have told the story of a detective seeking to enter a mysterious second dimension, aided by his ability to stand on one leg. He is being obstructed on this quest by a strange landscape of odd rooms and a threatening train; while being stalked by the "Donut Men", who wield electricity as a weapon. In addition to the detective's story, the film was to show the tale of Ronald d'Arte, a teenage dwarf, who suffers a surgical mishap which leaves him dependent on being plugged into an electrical supply at regular intervals; this dependence grants him an affinity over electricity which he can use to produce music or cause destruction. The boy names himself Ronnie Rocket and becomes a rock star, befriending a tap-dancer named Electra-Cute. Michael J. Anderson and Dexter Fletcher were attached to the lead role at different times. However, the project never materialized due to financial conflicts, so Lynch left the production and decided to direct The Elephant Man instead. Anderson later worked with Lynch in Twin Peaks.

1980s

The Metamorphosis 
At some point in the 1980s, Lynch adapted Franz Kafka's novella The Metamorphosis into a feature film screenplay. The project never came to fruition due to budgetary concerns to do with the expense of realizing Lynch's vision of the insect the protagonist of the story transforms into and also Lynch's eventual reluctance at adapting the novella, himself believing it was "better left as a book".

Venus Descending 
In 1987, after the success of Blue Velvet, Lynch was hired by a Warner Bros. executive to direct a film based on the life of famous actress Marilyn Monroe, based on the best-selling book Goddess. He co-wrote the script with writer Mark Frost, the first of many collaborations for the two. The film would have revolved around the last few months of life of Monroe (named Rosilyn Ramsay for legal reasons), before her supposed assassination at hands of Bobby Kennedy (renamed Phillip Malloy). However, one of the project's producers decided to drop it, and Lynch decided to focus on One Saliva Bubble.

One Saliva Bubble 
On May 20, 1987, Lynch and Mark Frost finished their script for a film project entitled One Saliva Bubble. The film's plot centered around the small town of Newtonville, Kansas, where a secret government project goes amok. The result is an exchange of identities of several of the townsfolk. Steve Martin was attached to star in the lead role, although Martin Short was also rumored to take that part. In the chapter 'Marty Throws A Party Just To Sing' of his 2014 autobiography, I Must Say: My Life as a Humble Comedy Legend, Martin Short states, "We bought the house on the basis of the income I was about to make from two pending movies. You can guess what happened next. Practically the second we signed the mortgage, one of the two movies, a David Lynch film with Steve Martin entitled, 'One Saliva Bubble', fell through." However, the film never came to fruition for unknown reasons, so Lynch left the project to focus on Northwest Passage (which would later become Twin Peaks).

1990s

Untitled Twin Peaks spin-off 
During the filming of Twin Peaks around the 1990s, Lynch considered at one point to release a spin-off film of the series film Twin Peaks: Fire Walk with Me centered around the character Audrey Horne. Actress Sherilyn Fenn was attached to reprise her role. While the project was not ultimately made, elements of the planned story later inspired Lynch's film Mulholland Drive.

Twin Peaks: Fire Walk with Me sequels 
Before the release of Twin Peaks: Fire Walk with Me, Lynch planned to release a sequel to the film for being a continuation of the series after its cancellation. He also planned a third film. However, these plans were scrapped after the bad reception of Fire Walk with Me.

Dream of the Bovine 
Around 1994, Lynch and Twin Peaks writer Robert Engels co-wrote a script entitled Dream of the Bovine. Engels described the script as being about "three guys, who used to be cows, living in Van Nuys and trying to assimilate their lives.” Harry Dean Stanton was attached to star and he and Lynch tried to convince Marlon Brando to co-star, but Brando was not interested, calling the script "pretentious bullshit".

Mulholland Drive television series 
In 1998, Lynch conceived the idea to make a TV series entitled Mulholland Drive. The project started as a 90-minute pilot produced by Touchstone Television and intended to be picked by the ABC network. However, during the filming of the pilot, ABC decided to not pick up the series. Lynch reworked the pilot as a feature film, which was released in 2001.

Woodcutters from Fiery Ships 
In 1998, Synergy Interactive, a Japanese video game production company, announced that they were developing a computer game entitled Woodcutters from Fiery Ships, designed primarily by Lynch.  Lynch was impressed with their earlier game Gadget: Invention, Travel, & Adventure, which he said "delivered an immersive experience to the user".  Lynch described the plot of Woodcutters as such: "Certain events have happened in a bungalow which is behind another in Los Angeles. And then suddenly the woodcutters arrive and they take the man who we think has witnessed these events, and their ship is... uh, silver, like a 30`s kind of ship, and the fuel is logs. And they smoke pipes." The game was cancelled in November of 1999, due to concerns that its "conundrum"–like story would be uninteresting to computer game players.

2010s

Antelope Don't Run No More 
In 2010, Lynch wrote his first film since Inland Empire, entitled Antelope Don't Run No More. The film is said to be set in Los Angeles and features "space aliens, talking animals, and a beleaguered musician named Pinky". Lynch was unable to secure financing for the project. There was some speculation that Lynch would be making the film with Netflix.

References

Sources
 
 

Works by David Lynch
Lynch, David